Claude Boucher may refer to:
 Claude Boucher (diplomat), former Canadian Ambassador Extraordinary and Plenipotentiary to Haiti
 Claude Boucher (politician) (born 1942), former Quebec politician

 Claude R. Boucher, first general manager of Videon Cablesystems